The Central Preparatory Commission was the body that co-ordinated the preparation of the schemas for the Second Vatican Council. It was established by Pope John XXIII on June 5, 1960. It had 120 members, including cardinals and bishops, amongst them was Cardinal Giovanni Battista Montini (the future Pope Paul VI), Archbishop Marcel Lefebvre, and Cardinal Ottaviani who chaired the Commission.

Nomination controversy
It had been expected that the members of the preparatory commissions, where the Roman Curia was heavily represented, would be confirmed as the majorities on the conciliar commissions. Senior French Cardinal Achille Liénart addressed the council, saying that the bishops could not intelligently vote for strangers.  He asked that the vote be postponed to give all the bishops a chance to draw up their own lists.  German Cardinal Josef Frings seconded that proposal, and the vote was postponed. The very first meeting of the council adjourned after only fifteen minutes.

Members

Bernardus Johannes Alfrink
Karl Joseph Alter
Augustin Bea
Octavio Beras Rojas
Michael Browne
John D'Alton
Julius Döpfner
Pericle Felici (Secretary-general)
Josef Frings
Denis Hurley
Franz König
Marcel Lefebvre
Paul-Émile Léger
Achille Liénart
Giovanni Battista Montini
Alfredo Ottaviani – Chair
Jérôme Rakotomalala
Joseph Ritter
Ernesto Ruffini
Leo Joseph Suenens
Bernard Yago

See also 

Ecumenical council

References

Pope John XXIII
Second Vatican Council
Christian organizations established in 1960